The CarGoTram was a freight tram in Dresden, Germany. It supplied Volkswagen's "Transparent Factory" with parts for car assembly.

History 

The idea of building a "transparent factory" for Volkswagen automobile production in Dresden arose in 1997. On 3 March 2000, Dresdner Verkehrsbetriebe AG (DVB AG, Dresden Public Transport Co.) and Volkswagen Automobil-Manufaktur Dresden GmbH signed a contract for the CarGoTram. Car parts were to be transported by tram from the logistics center in Dresden Friedrichstadt to the new factory, using infrastructure normally used for passenger trams.

Two CarGoTrams were built by Schalker Eisenhütte Maschinenfabrik GmbH Gelsenkirchen, at a cost of 6.5 million Deutsche Mark each.  

The freight tram was officially introduced in Dresden on 16 November 2000 and had its first test run on 3 January 2001.

Production of the VW Phaeton in Dresden ended in March 2016. The service restarted for production of the VW e-Golf in March 2017.

After first rumors appeared in mid 2020 that the CarGoTram will be soon out of service, Volkswagen finally announced on 19 October 2020 that it will stay in service until late December 2020. That was justified with the end of production of the VW e-Golf and the new logistics concept for the start of the VW ID.3 production. The last service was planned for 23 December 2020. 

On 10 December 2020, around two weeks before the last planned day in service, a van crashed into one of the CarGoTrams. The tram was turning right to the entry of the Gläserne Manufaktur ("Transparent Factory" of Volkswagen) as the car probably passed a red traffic light and collided with the tram. Both vehicles were damaged. As the other CarGoTram was also not in service at that time, this accident eventually was the end of service for the CarGoTram. If it will come into service again transporting other goods for another company someday, or if it may be used by DVB AG itself is unclear. As of December 2022, both trams are still parked in the tram depot.

Route
CarGoTram ran every hour. If necessary, it could run every 40 minutes. Several different routes were used. The main route went from the logistics center in Friedrichstadt via Postplatz and Grunaer Straße to Straßburger Platz and finally on to the factory. If there was heavy traffic, the tram could also take route via the main station or other routes.

Technology
The CarGoTram is a bidirectional vehicle consisting of 5 segments. The standard formation was three freight units and two combination freight/control units. The control cars have less capacity than the middle cars, because of space devoted to the driver’s cab.  
Total capacity is the equivalent of three trucks.  

The running gear for the tram was recycled from out-of-service Tatra trams, mostly Tatra T4. The bodies were newly built.

All axles of the control car as well as the middle cars were driven.

See also
 Cargo trams, use of trams for freight   
 Trams in Dresden

References

External links

Tram vehicles of Germany
Non-passenger multiple units
Transport in Dresden
Dresdner Verkehrsbetriebe